Nemacanthus (from  , 'to distribute' and  , 'spine') is an extinct genus of prehistoric sharks in the family Palaeospinacidae.

The species N. elegans is from the Triassic of Idaho, United States.

See also 
 List of prehistoric cartilaginous fish genera

References 

 Maisey, J. G. (1977). "The fossil selachian fishes Palaeospinax Egerton, 1872 and Nemacanthus Agassiz, 1837". Zoological Journal of the Linnean Society. 60 (3): 259–273.

External links 
 
 
 
 

Palaeospinacidae
Prehistoric shark genera
Taxa named by Louis Agassiz